John Wooding (February 10, 1857 – December 17, 1931) was an American politician in the state of Washington. He served in the Washington State Senate from 1895 to 1901.

References

1858 births
1931 deaths
King County Councillors
Republican Party Washington (state) state senators
Politicians from Saginaw, Michigan